Dialdehyde starch is a polysaccharide derived by chemical modification from starch. It is prepared by periodate oxidation of starch.

It has found use in the paper industry, where in it has been shown to improve the wet strength of consumer products like toilet paper and paper towels.

References

Starch

Organic polymers